Carlos Roffé (1 August 1943 – 31 December 2005) was an Argentine film and television actor active between 1969 and 2005.

Biography and career
Roffé was born in Buenos Aires.  He worked in the cinema of Argentina. IN 1985 he appeared as himself in Bairoletto, la aventura de un rebelde. In the late 1980s and early 1990s he appeared in a number of films of Alejandro Agresti. In 1999 he appeared in the film Animalada. In 2002 he appeared in Valentín.

In his acting career he appeared in well over 30 films and as well as on TV, he died of a vascular problem in 2005 having that year playing a character in the TV Series Criminal.

Filmography
Criminal (2005) (mini) TV Series .... Juez
Botines (2005) (mini) TV Series
Un mundo menos peor (2004) .... Cholo
Los Roldán (2004) TV Series (unknown episodes)
Rehen TV (2004) (TV) .... Juez
Mala sangre (2004) .... Arturo
Infieles (2004) (TV) .... Marido
Costumbres argentinas (2003) TV Series (unknown episodes)
Cien pesos (2003)
Tumberos (2002) (mini) TV Series .... Director cárcel
Valentín (2002/I) .... Dr. Galaburri
Cacería (2002) .... Micky
099 Central (2002) TV Series (uncredited) .... Inspector de policía
Los Simuladores .... Director escuela (1 episode, 2002)
Culpables (2001) (mini) TV Series
Cuatro amigas (2001) (mini) TV Series
Animalada (2001) .... Alberto
Una noche con Sabrina Love (2000) .... Montero
Plata quemada (2000) .... Nando
Vulnerables (1999) TV Series .... (1999)
Campeones de la vida (1999) TV Series .... Maeli
Mala época (1998)
El Viento se llevó lo qué (1998) .... Amalfi
El Impostor (1997/I) .... Police Chief
La cruz (1997) .... Pablo
Un día para siempre (1997)
Buenos Aires Vice Versa (1996) .... Service
Eva Perón (1996) .... Solari
Curva à la izquierda (1995)
El Acto en cuestión (1994) .... Miguel Quiroga
Boda secreta (1989) .... Merello
El Amor es una mujer gorda (1987)
Brigada explosiva contra los ninjas (1986) .... Profesor de Yoga
Pobre mariposa (1986)
Los Días de junio (1985)... aka Days in June (International: English title) 
Gente en Buenos Aires (1974)
Mosaico (1970)... aka Vida de una modelo, La (Argentina) 
El Ejército (1969) .... Narrator

References

External links
 

1943 births
2005 deaths
Argentine male film actors
People from Buenos Aires
Burials at La Chacarita Cemetery